Partial Answers: Journal of Literature and the History of Ideas is a peer-reviewed interdisciplinary academic journal that focuses on the study of literature and the history of ideas. The journal publishes articles on various national literatures including Hebrew, Yiddish, German, Russian, and (predominantly) English literature. It was named "Best New Journal of 2004" by the Council of Editors of Learned Journals.

The journal is published twice a year in January and June by the Johns Hopkins University Press. The current editor in chief is Leona Toker of the Hebrew University of Jerusalem.

References

External links 
 
 Partial Answers on the JHU Press website
 Partial Answers at Project MUSE

Literary magazines published in the United States
English-language journals
Publications established in 2003
Biannual journals
Johns Hopkins University Press academic journals